Kristal Brent Zook is an American journalist who focuses on race and gender. She is also a professor of journalism, media studies, and public relations at The Lawrence Herbert School of Communication at Hofstra University.

Life 
Zook received her Ph.D. from the University of California, Santa Cruz in 1994. Before teaching at Hofstra, she taught at Columbia University.

Zook is a former contributing writer for The Washington Post and Essence, and has contributed commentary to a variety of media outlets including CNN, NPR, BET, MSNBC, and MTV. She focuses on how the media portrays black people and has written books on the topic, Color by Fox and I See Black People. She also speaks on a variety of subjects including race, gender, multiracial identity, and social justice issues.

Bibliography

References 

Living people
University of California, Santa Cruz alumni
Columbia University faculty
Hofstra University faculty
1961 births